José Sacramento (born 1965) is a film director and producer from Portugal. His movie Filme da Treta was the highest-grossing Portuguese film in 2006.

References

External links

Living people
Portuguese film directors
1965 births
Date of birth missing (living people)
Place of birth missing (living people)
21st-century Portuguese people